Valsad INA is a town and an industrial notified area in Valsad district in the Indian state of Gujarat.

Demographics
 India census, Valsad INA had a population of 890. Males constitute 58% of the population and females 42%. Valsad INA has an average literacy rate of 83%, higher than the national average of 59.5%: male literacy is 84%, and female literacy is 82%. In Valsad INA, 10% of the population is under 6 years of age.

References

Cities and towns in Valsad district
Valsad